Bianca Bloch (19 January 1848 – early May 1901), also known by the pen name B. Waldow, was a German author.

Biography
Bloch was born in 1848 in Lauban, Silesia. Her father was attendant at a local court, who could only afford to send his children to primary school. She subsequently made up for the deficiency by extensive reading.

In collaboration with C. von Breckheyde (Aline Neumann) she wrote two plays, Ein Heisser Tag—a farce, 1881; and Vor dem Fest—a comedy, 1889. Her other works are: Blauaugen—a farce, 1891; In Ernster Zeit—a drama; Lieutenant und Assessor, oder Maiwein—a comedy; and Strohwitwer—a farce, 1892. Bloch also published poetry and fiction in various magazines.

Selected publications
 
  With C. von Breckheyde.
 
 
  With C. von Breckheyde.

References
 

1848 births
1901 deaths
19th-century German dramatists and playwrights
19th-century German Jews
19th-century German women writers
German women dramatists and playwrights
Jewish dramatists and playwrights
Jewish German writers
Jewish women writers
People from Lubań
Pseudonymous women writers
19th-century pseudonymous writers
20th-century pseudonymous writers